The Deeside Consortium is a local arrangement in Flintshire, North Wales between four schools:
 John Summers High
 Connah's Quay High in Connah's Quay
 St David's High in Saltney
 Flint High in Flint

The consortium exists to share 6th form education between the four schools. The schools are too small to provide good education in all the A-level courses on offer, so each school specialises.

Education in Flintshire